Vodny (masculine), Vodnaya (feminine), or Vodnoye (neuter) is the name of several inhabited localities in Russia.

Modern localities
Urban localities
Vodny, Komi Republic, an urban-type settlement under the administrative jurisdiction of the town of republic significance of Ukhta in the Komi Republic; 

Rural localities
Vodny, Republic of Adygea, a settlement in Krasnogvardeysky District of the Republic of Adygea; 
Vodny, Krasnoarmeysky District, Krasnodar Krai, a settlement in Oktyabrsky Rural Okrug of Krasnoarmeysky District in Krasnodar Krai; 
Vodny, Slavyansky District, Krasnodar Krai, a khutor in Petrovsky Rural Okrug of Slavyansky District in Krasnodar Krai; 
Vodny, Kurgan Oblast, a settlement in Berezovsky Selsoviet of Pritobolny District in Kurgan Oblast; 
Vodny, Samara Oblast, a settlement in Krasnoyarsky District of Samara Oblast
Vodny, Apanasenkovsky District, Stavropol Krai, a settlement in Aygursky Selsoviet of Apanasenkovsky District in Stavropol Krai
Vodny, Ipatovsky District, Stavropol Krai, a khutor under the administrative jurisdiction of the Town of Ipatovo in Ipatovsky District of Stavropol Krai
Vodny, Tula Oblast, a settlement in Medvensky Rural Okrug of Leninsky District in Tula Oblast
Vodnoye, a settlement in Krasnotorovsky Rural Okrug of Zelenogradsky District in Kaliningrad Oblast

Abolished localities
Vodny, Volgograd Oblast, a settlement in Gornopolyansky Selsoviet under the administrative jurisdiction of Sovetsky City District of the city of oblast significance of Volgograd in Volgograd Oblast; abolished in March 2010